Fat object may refer to:

 Fat object (geometry), a multi-dimensional geometrical object in mathematics
 Fat object (binary), a fat binary type of file in computing

See also
 Fat pointer